The Forestdale Plantation, also known as the McGowan-Fatherree Plantation, is a historic plantation in Pachuta, Mississippi, US. It was built from 1855 to 1857 with the forced labor of enslaved people for three brothers, Hamilton, Elbert and Robert McGowan. It has been listed on the National Register of Historic Places since May 22, 1980.

References

Houses on the National Register of Historic Places in Mississippi
Greek Revival houses in Mississippi
Houses completed in 1857
Houses in Clarke County, Mississippi
Plantations in Mississippi
National Register of Historic Places in Clarke County, Mississippi
1857 establishments in Mississippi